The Sunda Plate is a minor tectonic plate straddling the Equator in the Eastern Hemisphere on which the majority of Southeast Asia is located.

The Sunda Plate was formerly considered a part of the Eurasian Plate, but the GPS measurements have confirmed its independent movement at 10 mm/yr eastward relative to Eurasia.

Extent 
The Sunda Plate includes the South China Sea, the Andaman Sea, southern parts of Vietnam and Thailand along with Malaysia and the islands of Borneo, Sumatra, Java, and part of Sulawesi in Indonesia, plus the south-western Philippines islands of Palawan and the Sulu Archipelago.

The Sunda is bounded in the east by the Philippine Mobile Belt, Molucca Sea Collision Zone, Molucca Sea Plate, Banda Sea Plate and Timor Plate; to the south and west by the Australian Plate; and to the north by the Burma Plate, Eurasian Plate; and Yangtze Plate. The Indo-Australian Plate dips beneath the Sunda Plate along the Sunda Trench, which generates frequent earthquakes.

The eastern, southern, and western boundaries of the Sunda Plate are tectonically complex and seismically active. Only the northern boundary is relatively quiescent.

See also
 Kutai Basin
 List of earthquakes in Indonesia
 Sunda Arc
 Sunda Shelf
 Sunda Trench

References

Further reading
 Bird, P. (2003) An updated digital model of plate boundaries, Geochemistry, Geophysics, Geosystems, 4(3), 1027, .  also available as a PDF file (13 mb) 

Tectonic plates
South China Sea
Geology of Thailand
Geology of the Pacific Ocean
Geology of the Indian Ocean
Geology of Indonesia
Geology of Malaysia
Natural history of Asia
Natural history of the Philippines
Natural history of Singapore